Sascha Dum (born 3 July 1986) is a German former professional footballer who played as a midfielder for FC Teutonia Weiden.

Career
Dum signed a three-year professional contract with Bayer 04 Leverkusen in January 2005. He then left for Alemannia Aachen on an 18-month loan in January 2006. On the last match day of the 2006–07 season, Leverkusen announced that Dum would be part of the new season squad. On 26 August 2009, he left Leverkusen as he was loaned to FC Energie Cottbus for the season.

After that, he signed with Fortuna Düsseldorf and MSV Duisburg.

On 24 August 2015, he signed with Schalke 04 II.

Career statistics

Club

References

External links
 Leverkusen who's who
 
 

1986 births
Living people
Association football midfielders
German footballers
Bayer 04 Leverkusen players
Bayer 04 Leverkusen II players
Alemannia Aachen players
FC Energie Cottbus players
Fortuna Düsseldorf players
Bundesliga players
2. Bundesliga players
Sportspeople from Leverkusen
Germany under-21 international footballers
MSV Duisburg players
FC Schalke 04 II players
3. Liga players
Regionalliga players
Footballers from North Rhine-Westphalia